is a railway station in the city of Yurihonjō, Akita Prefecture,  Japan, operated by the third-sector  railway operator Yuri Kōgen Railway.

Lines
Yashima Station is a terminus of the Chōkai Sanroku Line, and is located 23.0 kilometers from the opposing terminus of the line at Ugo-Honjō Station.

Station layout
The station one side platform, with trains arriving at the station reversing direction for departure. The station also has the rail yard for the Chōkai Sanroku Line.

Adjacent stations

History
The JGR became the Japan National Railway (JNR) after World War II. All freight operations were discontinued from June 10, 1981. The Yashima Line was privatized on 1 October 1985, becoming the Yuri Kōgen Railway Chōkai Sanroku Line, and the station was renamed to its present name at that time. A new station building was completed on September 25, 2009.

Surrounding area
Yashima High School
Yashima Junior High School
Yashima Elementary School

See also
List of railway stations in Japan

External links

Railway stations in Akita Prefecture
Railway stations in Japan opened in 1938
Yurihonjō